Gokul Athokpam is an Indian actor who appears in Manipuri films. In addition to films, he has also worked in theatres, and has acted in many Shumang Kumheis, including Lidicegee Gulap, Nangna Luhongdringei and Lambidudei. In 2001, he got the title of Dawn Actor.
He has acted in many famous Manipuri films. Among them, Lucy Kamei, Tayai, Thabaton-1,2, Thouri, Imagee Ibungo, Lambidudei, Sakthibee Tampha, Western Sankirtan, Lamjasara, Tabunungda Akaiba Likli and Eidi Thamoi Pikhre may be mentioned.

He also produced the movie Tayai. In the beginning of his acting career in Manipuri films, he used to play antagonistic characters.

Accolades
Gokul Athokpam was selected for 4th Film Vision Special Award 2009-10 and 5th Film Vision Special Award 2010–11, by Film Academy Manipur (FAM). He is the recipient of the Best Actor in a Supporting Role award for the movie Bomb Blast at the 7th Manipur State Film Festival 2010. He won the Best Actor Award at the 3rd Sahitya Seva Samiti Manipur Film Award, SSS MANIFA 2014, organised by Sahitya Seva Samiti, Kakching and Film Forum Manipur, at Kakching Khullen Ibudhou Khamlangba Laikol on 21 April 2014 for his role Paari in the film Thajagee Maihing.

He won the Best Actor in a Leading Role Award in the 9th MANIFA 2020 for his role in the film Inamma.

Selected filmography

References 

Living people
21st-century Indian male actors
Indian male film actors
People from Imphal
Meitei people
Male actors from Manipur
1974 births
Shumang Kumhei artists